23rdAnnie Awards
November 11, 1995

Best Feature Film: 
Pocahontas

Best Television Program: 
The Simpsons

Best Video Production: 
The Gate to the Mind's Eye

Best Short Subject: 
Dexter's Laboratory

The 23rd Annie Awards were given by the International Animated Film Association to honor outstanding achievements in animation in 1995. Pocahontas led the nominations with 7 and won 4 awards, including Best Animated Feature. The Simpsons won its fourth consecutive award for Best Animated Television Program.

The June Foray Award is first given this year. The award is given to individuals who have made significant and benevolent or charitable impact on the art and industry of animation. The award was first given to the lady herself, June Foray.

Production categories
There were six competitive production categories in the 23rd Annie Awards. Outstanding achievements in animated interactive production and in animated promotional production were categories added during that year.

Winners are listed first, highlighted in boldface, and indicated with a double dagger.

Outstanding individual achievement
Outstanding achievement in production design, storyboarding and character animation were added, totaling seven competitive categories in individual achievements in that year.

Juried awards
Winsor McCay Award Recognition for career contributions to the art of animation
 Jules Engel
 Vance Gerry
 Dan McLaughlin

June Foray Award Recognition of benevolent/charitable impact on the art and industry of animation
 June Foray

Certificate of Merit Recognition for service to the art, craft and industry of animation
 King Features
 Sarah Baisley
 Dave Brain
 Gary Lah
 Amanda Haas
 Ginny Swift

Multiple wins and nominations

The following twelve productions received multiple nominations:

The following three productions received multiple awards:

References

External links
 
 Annie Awards 1995 at Internet Movie Database

1995
1995 film awards
Annie
Annie